Padmanabhanagar Assembly seat is one of the seats in Karnataka Legislative Assembly in India. It is a segment of Bangalore South Lok Sabha seat.

Padmanabhanagar constituency (ಪದ್ಮನಾಭನಗರ) came into existence after the 2008 delimitation of assembly segments came into effect.

Members of Assembly 
 1952-1962 : Constituency did not exist. See : Bangalore North
 1962-2008 : Constituency did not exist. See : Uttarahalli

Election results

2018 Assembly Election
 R Ashoka (BJP) : 77,868 votes
 V K Gopal (JD-S) : 45,702

2013 Assembly Election
 R Ashoka (BJP) : 53,680 votes  
 L S Chethan Gowda (INC) : 33,557  
 Dr M R V Prasad (JD-S) : 26,272

2008 Assembly Election
 R Ashoka (BJP) : 61,561 votes  
 M.V.Prasad Babu (Kabbadi Babu) (JD-S) : 30285

See also 
 List of constituencies of Karnataka Legislative Assembly
Uttarahalli Assembly constituency

References 

Assembly constituencies of Karnataka